Petersburg is a city in Grant County, West Virginia, United States. The population was 2,251 at the 2020 census. It is the county seat of Grant County.

History
Petersburg was founded circa 1745 by Jacob Peterson, who owned the area's first merchandising store.

In the 1830 United States Census, the population center of the United States was recorded as being about 9 miles southwest of the town.

The settlement was incorporated in 1910.

Registered Historic Places

 The Manor (ca. 1830)
 Hermitage Motor Inn (ca. 1840)
 Grant County Courthouse (1878–79)
 Rohrbaugh Cabin (ca. 1880)

Located near Petersburg (but in Pendleton County) is the Old Judy Church (1836), listed on the National Register of Historic Places since 1976.

Geography

Petersburg is located at  (38.993339, -79.126582).

Climate
The climate in this area has mild differences between highs and lows, and there is adequate rainfall year-round.  According to the Köppen Climate Classification system, Petersburg has an Oceanic climate, abbreviated "Cfb" on climate maps.

Transportation

Petersburg is served by several surface highways. The most prominent of these is U.S. Route 220, which enters Petersburg from the direction of Franklin and exits eastward towards Moorefield. West Virginia Route 28 and West Virginia Route 55 run concurrently through Petersburg, entering from the direction of Seneca Rocks and joining U.S. Route 220 on its journey towards Moorefield. Finally, West Virginia Route 42 begins at Route 28 and Route 55 in Moorefield, heading northward towards Elk Garden.

Medical care 
Grant Memorial Hospital serves three counties in the West Virginia Panhandle.

Demographics

2010 census
As of the census of 2010, there were 2,467 people, 1,113 households, and 614 families living in the city. The racial makeup of the city was 94.3% White, 2.0% African American, 0.2% Native American, 0.2% Asian, 2.0% from other races, and 1.3% from two or more races. Hispanic or Latino of any race were 3.4% of the population.

There were 1,113 households, of which 24.7% had children under the age of 18 living with them, 38.6% were married couples living together, 12.1% had a female householder with no husband present, 4.4% had a male householder with no wife present, and 44.8% were non-families. 38.5% of all households were made up of individuals, and 19.7% had someone living alone who was 65 years of age or older. The average household size was 2.11 and the average family size was 2.77.

The median age in the city was 47.1 years. 19.3% of residents were under the age of 18; 8% were between the ages of 18 and 24; 20.5% were from 25 to 44; 27% were from 45 to 64; and 25.4% were 65 years of age or older. The gender makeup of the city was 46.2% male and 53.8% female.

2000 census
As of the census of 2000, there were 2,423 people, 1,086 households, and 620 families living in the city. The population density was 1,482.6 people per square mile (573.9/km2). There were 1,222 housing units at an average density of 747.7 per square mile (289.5/km2). The racial makeup of the city was 97.44% White, 1.57% African American, 0.12% Native American, 0.17% Asian, 0.29% from other races, and 0.41% from two or more races. Hispanic or Latino of any race were 0.78% of the population.

There were 1,086 households, out of which 23.4% had children under the age of 18 living with them, 44.3% were married couples living together, 10.4% had a female householder with no husband present, and 42.9% were non-families. 38.0% of all households were made up of individuals, and 19.0% had someone living alone who was 65 years of age or older. The average household size was 2.10 and the average family size was 2.75.

In the city, the population was spread out, with 19.0% under the age of 18, 8.8% from 18 to 24, 23.8% from 25 to 44, 24.1% from 45 to 64, and 24.3% who were 65 years of age or older. The median age was 44 years. For every 100 females, there were 83.6 males. For every 100 females age 18 and over, there were 78.5 males.

The median income for a household in the city was $24,867, and the median income for a family was $32,941. Males had a median income of $23,654 versus $20,250 for females. The per capita income for the city was $19,642. About 11.9% of families and 17.5% of the population were below the poverty line, including 25.3% of those under age 18 and 11.2% of those age 65 or over.

Notable people
 Codie Rohrbaugh, NASCAR driver
 Joan Banks (1918-1998), prolific radio actress, a regular on Gang Busters and 33 episodes of CBS Radio Mystery Theater, who also appeared in many classic TV series like Perry Mason (TV series) and Alfred Hitchcock Presents.  She was married to actor Frank Lovejoy.
 M. Blane Michael (1943-2011), Circuit Judge, United States Court of Appeals for the Fourth Circuit.

References

Cities in West Virginia
Cities in Grant County, West Virginia
County seats in West Virginia
1745 establishments in Virginia